Jeli is a federal constituency in Jeli District, Kelantan, Malaysia, that has been represented in the Dewan Rakyat since 1995.

The federal constituency was created in the 1994 redistribution and is mandated to return a single member to the Dewan Rakyat under the first past the post voting system.

Demographics 
https://live.chinapress.com.my/ge15/parliament/KELANTAN

History

Polling districts
According to the federal gazette issued on 31 October 2022, the Jeli constituency is divided into 28 polling districts.

Representation history

State constituency

Current state assembly members

Local governments

Election results

References

Kelantan federal constituencies